Don't Spare the Horses was a British television comedy series which aired on the BBC during 1952. It featured Jimmy James, Harry Secombe, Peter Sellers, and Spike Milligan. It aired live for three episodes. These live transmissions were not recorded, as the BBC very rarely telerecorded shows prior to the mid-1950s.

References

External links
Don't Spare the Horses on IMDb

1950s British comedy television series
1952 British television series debuts
1952 British television series endings
Lost BBC episodes
BBC Television shows
Black-and-white British television shows
BBC television comedy
British live television series